Ana Mendoza Velasco (born October 4, 1970) is a retired female breaststroke swimmer from Mexico. She represented her native country at the 1992 Summer Olympics in Barcelona, Spain. There, she ended up in 17th place (4:26.73) in the Women's 4 × 100 m Medley Relay event, alongside Heike Koerner (backstroke), Gabriela Gaja (butterfly), and Laura Sánchez (freestyle).

References
 sports-reference

1970 births
Living people
Mexican female swimmers
Female breaststroke swimmers
Swimmers at the 1992 Summer Olympics
Olympic swimmers of Mexico
20th-century Mexican women